Bhagowal is a village situated alongside Sialkot–Zafarwal road in Sialkot District, Pakistan. The village is situated about 30 km east of Sialkot. 

Villages in Sialkot District